Zygote in My Coffee (often referred to simply as Zygote) was a popular underground independent print and online magazine that ran from December 31, 2003 until May 30, 2010, which dealt mostly in experimental and "street" poetry, though it also published content such as short fiction, social commentary, political rants, one-act plays, erotica, and adult-oriented comic strips. The magazine was started in San Jose, California by poet and cartoonist Brian Fugett, who later moved to and published out of Kettering, Ohio. At one time, co-editors included Karl Koweski, Aleathia Drehmer, and C. Allen Rearick.

Notes and references

External links
Zygote In My Coffee archives

Defunct literary magazines published in the United States
Independent magazines
Magazines established in 2003
Magazines disestablished in 2010
Magazines published in California
Magazines published in Ohio
Mass media in San Jose, California
Online literary magazines published in the United States
Poetry magazines published in the United States
Zines